The 1950–51 FAW Welsh Cup is the 64th season of the annual knockout tournament for competitive football teams in Wales.

Key
League name pointed after clubs name.
CCL - Cheshire County League
FL D2 - Football League Second Division
FL D3N - Football League Third Division North
FL D3S - Football League Third Division South
SFL - Southern Football League

Fifth round
Eight winners from the Fourth round and six new clubs.

Sixth round
Seven winners from the Fifth round plus one new club.

Semifinal
Cardiff City and Wrexham played at Shrewsbury, both matches between Newport County and Merthyr Tydfil were held at Cardiff.

Final
Final and replay were held at Swansea.

External links
The FAW Welsh Cup

1950-51
Wales
Cup